= IUCAB =

- Internationally United Commercial Agents and Brokers
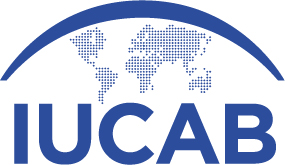
- Founded: 1953; 73 years ago
- Type: Trade and business organisation
- Purpose: Commercial Agents, Distributors and Independent sales companies
- Location: Vienna, Austria
- Region served: Worldwide
- Key people: Olivier Mazoyer, President Christian Rebernig, Secretary General
- Website: iucab.com

IUCAB (Internationally United Commercial Agents and Brokers) is the worldwide trade alliance of independent sales organisations. It was founded in 1953 in Amsterdam and is headquartered in Vienna, Austria. The alliance represents the interests of the member associations as well as their members at an international level.

Today's membership of IUCAB consists of 20 national associations throughout the European Union, North America, Asia and Africa representing approximately 600,000 commercial agencies and independent sales companies. The agencies generate for their principals a turnover of EUR 999 billions.

Through the international B2B platform for trade and distribution, IUCAB supports principals (manufacturers/suppliers) around the globe to develop and expand their sales through arranging representations.
